Mauro Chiosti (born July 19, 1948) is an Italian sprint canoer who competed in the early 1970s. At the 1972 Summer Olympics in Munich, he was eliminated in the repechages of both the K-1 1000 m event.

References
Sports-reference.com profile

1948 births
Canoeists at the 1972 Summer Olympics
Italian male canoeists
Living people
Olympic canoeists of Italy
Place of birth missing (living people)
20th-century Italian people